Raghupathi Venkaiah Naidu  (15 October 1869 – 15 March 1941), was an Indian filmmaker, photographer, graphic artist, educationist and entrepreneur considered as the father of Telugu cinema. Regarded as one of the pioneers of Indian cinema, Venkaiah started his career as a commercial photographer in Madras; he was drawn into independent filmmaking, and he traveled to different regions in South east Asia to promote and teach cinematic techniques, filmmaking, and distribute foreign language silent films.

Venkaiah Naidu founded one of the first cinematograph company in South India called "The Glass Studio" equipped with sound-on-disc display technology, allowing play back sound in sync with a motion picture. In 1912, he founded The Gaiety movie theater which was the first in Madras to screen films on a full-time basis. The Raghupati Venkaiah Award is an annual award incorporated into the state Nandi Awards honoring veteran artists who made significant contributions in Telugu cinema.

Biography

Early life
Venkaiah Naidu is born to the second son of an Indian Army official Subedar Appayya Naidu in Machilipatnam, Andhra Pradesh, India. His brother Raghupathi Venkataratnam Naidu was a noted educationalist and social reformer. His forefathers worked as Commanders in the Army of East Indian Company and Madras Army in Hyderabad Regiments. At the age of 18, he moved to Madras and started drawing pictures and carving sculptures at Mount Road and selling them. He then learned photography and founded a photographic studio.

Photographer
In 1909, he introduced Chrono Mega phone, equipment that relates sounds with pictures, from John Dickinson and Company. To pay for the Chrono Mega phone he bought for Rs 30,000, he rented out his photo studio. He shot 12 short films and exhibited them in Victoria Public Hall. He also travelled to Bangalore, Vijayawada, Sri Lanka, Rangoon and Pegu to exhibit his films.

Theatre owner
In 1910, he established Esplanade Ten House to exhibit his films. In 1912, he constructed Gaiety Talkies on Mount Road, the first Indian-owned cinema theatre in Chennai. He later constructed Crown Theatre on Mint Street and Globe Theatre in Purasawakkam, Madras. He also exhibited American and British films. Some of the first movies shown in his theatres were Million Dollar Mystery, Mysteries of Meera, Clutching Hand, Broken Coin, Raja's casket, Peral fish, and 'Great Bard'. He established a film library and provided training on cinematic techniques.

Film producer
In 1919, he started a production company called Star of East Films and a film studio called Glass Studio. He sent his son, Raghupati Surya Prakash Naidu, to study cinematography in London. Father and son made their first movie "Meenakshi Kalyanam" around actual locations of the Madurai Meenakshi temple. Later, they produced films like Gajendra Moksham, Mathsyavatharam, Nandanaar, and Bhishma Pratigna, the first Telugu mookie (i.e., movie with no playback voices). He faced high competition with East India Film Company, and went bankrupt. Later, his son and Yaragudipati Varada Rao established a long-lasting precedent of focusing exclusively on religious themes; Nandanar, Gajendra Moksham, and Matsyavatar, three of their most noted productions, centered on religious figures, parables, and morals. Venkaiah died on 15 March 1941 due to medical illness.

Filmography 
Meenakshi Kalyanam
Gajendra Moksham
Mathsyavatharam
Nandanaar
Bhishma Pratigya (1921)

See also 
Dadasaheb Phalke
H. M. Reddy

References

19th-century births
1941 deaths
Telugu film directors
Film directors from Andhra Pradesh
Indian silent film directors
People from Krishna district
People from Machilipatnam
Indian illustrators
20th-century Indian film directors
Indian editors
Writers who illustrated their own writing
Indian industrialists
Indian cinematographers
Businesspeople from Andhra Pradesh
Indian business executives
Indian technology company founders